Alleandra Morgan Watt (born March 12, 1997) is an American professional soccer player who currently plays as a forward for Orlando Pride of the National Women's Soccer League (NWSL). She previously played for North Carolina Courage, Melbourne City, and OL Reign. She has represented the United States on the under-23 and under-20 national teams.

Early life and education
Born and raised in Colorado Springs, Colorado, Watt attended Pine Creek High School where she was a four-year varsity track and field athlete and won state titles in the 100 Meter and 200 Meter in 2012 and 2014. She won back-to-back state titles in 2013 and 2014 in the 4x100 Meter and 4x200 Meter. She was named Most Valuable Player (MVP) at the 2014 Kansas Relays. Watt played for the regional and state Olympic Development Program (ODP) teams. She was twice named Most Valuable Player at the Colorado State Cup. She played club soccer for Pride Soccer Club Predators 97 under Coach Sian Hudson.

Watt attended Texas A&M University where she played collegiate soccer for the Texas A&M Aggies. While at A&M she was appointed captain of the team, and was the first Aggie to be selected for the United Soccer Coaches All-America First Team twice. In her four years with the Aggies, Watt competed in 90 matches, notched over 110 career points with 49 goals, including 19 game-winning goals, and 12 assists. During her senior season, Watt earned All-American First Team and SEC Forward of the Year honors. She scored 16 goals with provided 11 assists to lead the team to a 14–5–3 record and reach the second round of the NCAA Division I tournament. As a junior, she earned All-America and All-SEC honors and led the team in points (33) and goals (15). As a sophomore, Watt led the team in points (24) and goals (11). She earned  SEC All-Tournament honors after scoring four goals against Missouri in the SEC Tournament quarterfinal the same year.

Club career

North Carolina Courage and Melbourne City, 2020
On January 16, 2020, Watt was selected 6th overall by the North Carolina Courage in the 2020 NWSL College Draft. She was not initially signed to the team and on January 30, 2020, she signed for Melbourne City in Australia for the remainder of the 2019–20 W-League season which ran congruently with the NWSL offseason. She made her professional debut as a substitute on February 16, 2020, in a 4–0 win away at Melbourne Victory. She scored her first goal for the club in the following matchweek against Western Sydney Wanderers. Watt appeared in all five games to conclude the season including a behind-closed-doors grand final victory due to the COVID-19 pandemic. Watt described the match as "a little different" but "historical" before rushing to catch a flight back to America after the match due to the uncertainty of international travel.

On June 19, 2020, Watt signed a two-year contract with North Carolina Courage ahead of the 2020 NWSL Challenge Cup. She made her debut for the North Carolina Courage on June 27 in the Challenge Cup but was injured in the 13th minute, suffering an ACL tear that ruled her out for the remainder of 2020 season.

OL Reign, 2021–22 

Watt was traded to OL Reign at the end of the 2020 season and made five appearances for the club during the 2021 season. She made her debut for the club during a 3–2 win against Chicago Red Stars on October 10, 2021, which secured a berth to the NWSL Playoffs for the Reign. OL Reign were ultimately eliminated in the Playoffs by eventual champion Washington Spirit.

During the 2022 season, Watt was a starting forward in 3 the 14 games she played. On July 1, her pass to Jess Fishlock who served the throughball assist to Bethany Balcer helped lift the Reign to a 2–0 win over North Carolina Courage.

Orlando Pride, 2022–
On August 15, 2022, Watt was traded to Orlando Pride in exchange for $125,000 in allocation money.

International career 
Watt has played internationally for the United States women's national under-20 soccer team including at the 2016 FIFA U-20 Women's World Cup in Papua New Guinea where she scored two goals. In March 2015, she scored a brace against Sweden at the La Manga Tournament lifting the team to a 2–0 win. In November 2017 and May 2018, she was called up to training camps for the United States women's national under-23 soccer team. In March 2019, she was named to the U-23 team roster for the 2019 Thorns Spring Invitational, a pre-NWSL season tournament hosted by the Portland Thorns.

Personal life
Watt has been in a relationship with Donavan Brazier since 2017. She is of Filipina, Black and white heritage.

Career statistics

Club summary
.

Honors
Texas A&M Aggies
SEC Women's Soccer Tournament: 2017

Melbourne City
W-League Premiership: 2019–20
W-League Championship: 2019–20

References

External links 

 
 Player profile at Orlando Pride
 
 Ally Watt at Texas A&M

1997 births
Living people
American women's soccer players
Texas A&M Aggies women's soccer players
North Carolina Courage draft picks
North Carolina Courage players
Melbourne City FC (A-League Women) players
A-League Women players
Soccer players from Colorado
People from Colorado Springs, Colorado
Women's association football forwards
United States women's under-20 international soccer players
National Women's Soccer League players
African-American women's soccer players
21st-century African-American sportspeople
21st-century African-American women
American sportspeople of Filipino descent
OL Reign players
Orlando Pride players